Rodrigo Javier Hinzpeter Kirberg (born 27 October 1965) is a Chilean lawyer and politician. He was one of the founders of National Renewal, a center-right political party. He was appointed Interior Minister on 11 March 2010 by President of Chile Sebastián Piñera. On 5 November 2012 he was appointed Defense Minister and his term ended on 11 March 2014.

Hinzpeter currently works for the Quiñenco holding and was present during its negotiations with Grupo Cartes in June 2022.

Biography
Hinzpeter was born in Santiago to a Jewish family. He is married and the father of three children.

Hinzpeter studied at the Doctor Chaim Weizmann Hebrew Institute until he was expelled. He graduated from high school at Liceo Alexander Fleming, a subsidized private school. He then studied law at the Gabriela Mistral University and then was accepted at the Pontifical Catholic University of Chile (PUC) through a special admission vacancy. He subsequently majored in legal and social sciences at the university, obtaining his law degree from the Chilean Supreme Court.

Hinzpeter was a professor of civil law at the PUC, and he is the author of La hipoteca (1993).

Hinzpeter is a member of the Chilean Bar Association and he worked as an attorney at Simpson Thacher & Bartlett in New York City.

Hinzpeter has combined his practice as a lawyer with an active role in Chilean politics. He is one of the founders of National Renewal, where he was national secretary and first vice-president. He was a member of its political committee. In 2005, he acted as campaign manager for President-elect Sebastián Piñera and as his general coordinator during the recent presidential elections.

References

External links 

1965 births
Living people
Politicians from Santiago
Chilean Jews
National Renewal (Chile) politicians
Chilean Ministers of the Interior
Chilean Ministers of Defense
Pontifical Catholic University of Chile alumni
Chilean people of Austrian-Jewish descent
Chilean people of Russian-Jewish descent
Chilean people of Argentine-Jewish descent
Chilean people of German-Jewish descent
20th-century Chilean lawyers
21st-century Chilean lawyers